Lenin vivo (Alive Lenin) is a 1970 short documentary directed by Joaquim Jordà and Gianni Toti.

It compiles all the known footage and recorded speeches of Vladimir Lenin, adding comments to the images and analysis about the historic period, especially the Russian Revolution of 1917 and the beginning of the USSR.

External links 
 

Films about Vladimir Lenin
Italian documentary films
1970s Italian films